Andri Faisal Amru (born 27 July 1994) is an Indonesian footballer who currently plays for Persatu Tuban in Liga 2 as a forward.

Career

PSM Makassar
Andri joined in the squad for the 2016 Indonesia Soccer Championship A.

References

External links
 Andri Faisal Amru

1994 births
Indonesian footballers
Living people
Association football forwards
Sportspeople from Central Sulawesi
PSM Makassar players